Axiom Mission 2 (or Ax-2) is a planned private crew mission to the International Space Station (ISS), operated by Axiom Space. In December 2021, NASA confirmed that the mission would fly on a Crew Dragon. In August 2022, NASA announced that the mission would launch in the second quarter of 2023. It is the second Axiom mission, after Axiom Mission 1 in April 2022.

Crew 
The crew will include former NASA Astronaut Peggy Whitson as mission commander and John Shoffner as pilot.

In September 2022 it was reported that Saudi Arabia's Saudi Space Commission bought the remaining two seats for the mission, including one for a female astronaut, Rayyanah Barnawi.

On January 11, 2022, Axiom announced Italian Air Force (ItAF) Colonel Walter Villadei as the company’s first international professional astronaut. He is currently in training in Houston. Col. Villadei has been selected by Axiom as a backup on the Ax-2 mission.

Prime crew

Backup crew

References 

Axiom Space
2023 in spaceflight
2023 in the United States
Future human spaceflights
International Space Station